The Ministry of Construction (MOC) is a government ministry in Vietnam responsible for state administration on construction, building materials, housing and office buildings, architecture, urban and rural construction planning, urban infrastructure, public services; and representing the owner of state capital in state-owned enterprises.

Ministerial units
 State Agency for Construction Quality Inspection
 Agency for Management of Housing and Real Estate Market
 Agency for Urban Development
 Agency for Infrastructure
 Department of Building Materials
 Department of Construction Management
 Department of Science, Technology and Environment
 Department of Construction Economics
 Department of Architecture and Construction Planning
 Department of Legislation
 Department of Planning and Finance
 Department of International Cooperation
 Department of Organisation and Personnel
 Ministry's Inspectorate
 Ministry's Office

Administrative units
 Construction Newspaper
 Construction Magazine
 Construction Publishing House
 Institute for Building Materials
 Institute for Construction Economics
 Institute for Architecture, Urban and Rural Planning
 Institute for Construction Science and Technology
 Construction Hospital

External links
 (VN) and (EN) Official site

Construction
Governmental office in Hanoi
Vietnam, Construction
Vietnam
Vietnam